Promanullin is a cyclic nonribosomal peptide. It is an amatoxin, all of which are found in the mushroom genus Amanita.

Toxicology

Like other amatoxins, proamanullin is an inhibitor of RNA polymerase II.  Promanullin has a specific attraction to the enzyme RNA polymerase II. Upon ingestion, it binds to the RNA polymerase II enzyme, effectively causing cytolysis of hepatocytes (liver cells).

See also
Mushroom poisoning

References

External links
Amatoxins REVISED 

Peptides
Amatoxins
Hepatotoxins
Tryptamines